Sharon Corbett (married name Sharon Avann) (born 1953), is a former athlete who competed for England.

Athletics career
She represented England and won a bronze medal in the javelin event, at the 1974 British Commonwealth Games in Christchurch, New Zealand.

References

1953 births
English female javelin throwers
Commonwealth Games medallists in athletics
Commonwealth Games bronze medallists for England
Athletes (track and field) at the 1974 British Commonwealth Games
Living people
Medallists at the 1974 British Commonwealth Games